Wacław Święcicki (1848–1900) was a Polish poet and socialist. He was the author of the revolutionary song Whirlwinds of Danger (Warszawianka 1905), the music to which was written by Józef Pławiński.

1848 births
1900 deaths
Polish poets
Polish socialists
19th-century poets